Zorleni is a commune in Vaslui County, Western Moldavia, Romania. It is composed of four villages: Dealu Mare, Popeni, Simila and Zorleni. Bujoreni Monastery is located within this commune, east of Zorleni.

References

Communes in Vaslui County
Localities in Western Moldavia